Titus Flavius Clemens may refer to:

Titus Flavius Clemens (consul), Roman politician and cousin of the emperor Domitian, consul AD 95
Clement of Alexandria, Christian theologian and philosopher